Falmouth was built in America and entered Lloyd's Register in 1796. She became a Liverpool-based slave ship that a privateer captured during Falmouths first voyage in the triangular trade in enslaved people.

Lloyd's Register listed her with Pearson, master, J.Hodgson, owner, and trade Liverpool–Africa.

Captain Richard Pearson sailed from Liverpool for West Africa on 21 July 1796. She was reported in January 1797 to have reached Africa. Falmouth acquired her slaves at Îles de Los.

As she was on her way to Barbados, a Spanish privateer of 18 guns captured her.

Another report had a French squadron under "Renier" capturing , Thompson master, Galbraith, master, and Falmouth, Pearson, master, on the African Windward Coast. The French then gave Falmouth up to the crews.

It is quite possible that Falmouth was captured twice, first by the French and then by the Spanish privateer. There is no further mention of Falmouth in Lloyd's List for 1797 or 1798 after the above two reports, including no mention in the ship arrivals and departure (SAD) data, suggesting that if the French gave her up she did not return to England. Bell was on her eighth voyage as a slave ship when she was captured.  Union was on her first slave voyage, and had not embarked any slaves before she was captured.

Citations

1790s ships
Ships built in the United States
Age of Sail merchant ships of England
Liverpool slave ships
Captured ships